Castle Rising was a parliamentary borough in Norfolk, which elected two Members of Parliament (MPs) to the House of Commons from 1558 until 1832, when it was abolished by the Great Reform Act. Its famous members of Parliament included the future Prime Minister Robert Walpole and the diarist Samuel Pepys.

History
The borough extended over four parishes - Castle Rising, Roydon, North Wootton and South Wootton, in rural Norfolk to the north-east of King's Lynn. Castle Rising had once been a market town and seaport, but long before the Reform Act had declined to little more than a village. In 1831, the population of the borough was 888, and contained 169 houses.

Castle Rising was a burgage borough, meaning that the right to vote was vested in the owners of particular properties ("burgage tenements"), and that consequently the absolute right to nominate both the MPs could be bought and sold. Although it was possible for the landowner to create multiple voters by giving a reliable nominee notional ownership of the tenements - as was done in many other burgage boroughs - in Castle Rising the number of voters was kept as low as possible, and contested elections were almost unknown.

The Lord of the Manor invariably owned a majority of the burgage tenements, though other influential local families were generally allowed to select the second MP. In the seventeenth century the Duke of Norfolk was the dominant interest: it was the Norfolk interest which enabled Samuel Pepys to gain the seat  in 1673. At the start of the 18th century, the borough belonged to the Walpole family, and Sir Robert Walpole (Britain's first Prime Minister) began his parliamentary career here. Later in the century the Walpoles still nominated one MP, and the Earl of Suffolk the other. By 1816 the patronage had passed to the Earl of Cholmondeley and Richard Howard.

Castle Rising was abolished as a constituency by the Reform Act of 1832.

Members of Parliament

1558-1640

1640-1832

Notes

References 
Robert Beatson, A Chronological Register of Both Houses of Parliament (London: Longman, Hurst, Res & Orme, 1807) 
D Brunton & D H Pennington, Members of the Long Parliament (London: George Allen & Unwin, 1954)
Cobbett's Parliamentary history of England, from the Norman Conquest in 1066 to the year 1803 (London: Thomas Hansard, 1808) 
 J E Neale, The Elizabethan House of Commons (London: Jonathan Cape, 1949)
 J Holladay Philbin, Parliamentary Representation 1832 - England and Wales (New Haven: Yale University Press, 1965)
Henry Stooks Smith, The Parliaments of England from 1715 to 1847 (2nd edition, edited by FWS Craig - Chichester: Parliamentary Reference Publications, 1973)

Parliamentary constituencies in Norfolk (historic)
Constituencies of the Parliament of the United Kingdom established in 1558
Constituencies of the Parliament of the United Kingdom disestablished in 1832
Rotten boroughs
Castle Rising